At least 3 ships of the Imperial Russian Navy have been named Imperator Nikolai I after 
the Tsar Nicholas I of Russia.

  - 111-gun steam-powered ship of the line that served with the Baltic Fleet; stricken in 1874.
  -  captured during the Battle of Tsushima in 1905 by the Japanese and renamed Iki. Sunk as a target ship in 1915.
  - Dreadnought whose construction at Nikolayev was interrupted by World War I and scrapped in 1927.

Russian Navy ship names